The Ruhrpott Roller Girls (RPRG) is a women's flat track roller derby league based in Essen, Germany. Founded in 2009, the league consists of two teams, which compete against teams from other leagues. Ruhrpott is a member of the Women's Flat Track Derby Association (WFTDA).

History
The league was founded in the summer of 2009, as Devil Dolls Essen.  It played its first bout the following summer, against Barockcity Rollerderby, and competed in the first German Roller Derby Championship in December 2010, taking third place behind the Stuttgart Valley Rollergirlz and Bear City Roller Derby.

Three Ruhrpott skaters were selected to play for Roller Derby Germany at the 2011 Roller Derby World Cup.

In April 2013, Ruhrpott was accepted as a member of the Women's Flat Track Derby Association Apprentice Program, and became a full WFTDA member league in October 2014.

WFTDA rankings

References

Sport in Essen
Roller derby leagues established in 2009
Roller derby leagues in Germany
2009 establishments in Germany